Victor is a 2009 French comedy film directed by Thomas Gilou. It is an adaptation of a novel by French author Michèle Fitoussi, who has also been a magazine editor.

Plot

The story involves the elderly Victor, a contest organized by a magazine, and a family who "adopts" the ailing old man. Complications ensue, often to comedic effect.

Cast
 Pierre Richard as Victor Corbin 
 Clémentine Célarié as Sylvie Saillard
 Lambert Wilson as Jérôme Courcelle
 Antoine Duléry as Guillaume Saillard
 Sara Forestier as Alice
 Sophie Mounicot as Lydia
 Catherine Hosmalin as Madame Barbosa
 Marie-France Mignal as Sylvie's mother
 Eric Haldezos as Paco

References

External links

Victor  at allocine.fr

2009 films
2009 comedy films
French comedy films
Films based on French novels
2000s French films
2000s French-language films